Dravyavati River is major South-flowing river in Rajasthan. It originates in on the western slope of Amber hills and flows through the Jaipur city, north to south over a length of 57.5 km, making it one of the smallest river in India, providing a major source of water to the city. It finally joins the Dhund river, near Santoshpura. Most of the Jaipur city's population stays within the 10 km periphery of Dravyavati river.

Deterioration
In 2016 the river was described as having deteriorated into a nullah, over the preceding century. The river had been comprehensively damaged by local pollution, garbage and debris. Tata has been allotted the task to clear debris and filth of the nulla to rejuvenate it to her ancient glory, progress have been made over years but it still seems to have a long way too go considering some of the nulla in residential areas such as  Kartarpura Nulla is not been integrated in the project despite constant pleas and lawsuits by the locals, it has been contended that Kartarpura nulla turns into a massive sink hole risking lives of people passing nearby when it downpours intensely. the matter is still pending in the High Court, Jaipur. Two River fronts have been constructed across Jaipur city as part of this project.

One cause of the pollution is the collection of storm water from adjoining areas such as Ambabari, the Walled City of Jaipur, Sanganer town and Pratap Nagar. Sewerage mixed with domestic wastewater and industrial waste drains into the river through Nahri ka Nallah, Jawahar Nallah and other streams that come from structured and unstructured sewerage systems of the suburbs.

Major flooding occurred in July 1981 that washed away many dams and embankments on the river. Subsequent encroaching development and pollution changed the nature of the river to the degree that it became known as "Amanishah nullah". Another flood in August 2012 left the city of Jaipur devastated, thousands homeless and many dead.

Rejuvenation project
In 2015 Tata Group produced a report for the rejuvenation of the river. This was approved by Rajasthan's state-level empowered committee (SLEC) in October 2015, having an estimated ten-year project cost, covering construction, operation and maintenance, of over 19 million Rupees. The contract for the project was awarded by the Jaipur Development Authority (JDA) to a consortium comprising Tata Projects and the Shanghai Urban Construction Group with an initial cost of over 16 million Rupees to complete the work by October 2018. Construction works will include 85 check dams and 122 fall structures.

As part of the rejuvenation project a combined footpath and cycle track running alongside the river from the source at Jaisalya to Goner, 47 km2, has been proposed.

References

Rivers of Rajasthan
Geography of Jaipur
Rivers of India